Abdul Kahar was the sixth Sultan of Brunei. He ruled from 1524 until stepping down from the throne in 1530 to allow his nephew and adopted-son Saiful Rijal to become Sultan .. When his son ascended to the throne, Abdul Kahar acted as Regent with the title Paduka Seri Begawan Sultan. After his demise in 1578, he was known as Marhum Keramat.

See also
 List of Sultans of Brunei

References

Year of birth unknown
1578 deaths
16th-century Sultans of Brunei